The Third is a Japanese media franchise.

The Third may also refer to:
The Third (album), an album by Henry Santos
Her Third, a 1971 GDR film, aka The Third
The Third, manga character, see list of Naruto characters
III, a generational title given to a third family member of the same name
Shrek the Third, a 2007 computer-animated film by DreamWorks Animation

See also
Third (disambiguation)
The Third Age (disambiguation)